The Journal of Computational Biophysics and Chemistry is a peer-reviewed scientific journal covering developments in theoretical and computational chemistry and biophysics, as well as their applications to other scientific fields, such as medicine, pharmaceutical and materials sciences. It was established in 2002 as the Journal of Theoretical and Computational Chemistry, obtaining its current title in 2021. It is published by World Scientific and the editor-in-chief is Emil Alexov (Clemson University).

Abstracting and indexing 
The journal is abstracted and indexed in:
Chemical Abstracts Service
Current Contents/Physical, Chemical & Earth Sciences
EBSCO databases
Inspec
ProQuest databases
Science Citation Index Expanded
Scopus
According to the Journal Citation Reports, the journal has a 2021 impact factor of 2.440.

References

External links 

Chemistry journals
Publications established in 2002
English-language journals
World Scientific academic journals